Tumalo Falls is a  waterfall on Tumalo Creek, in the Cascade Range west of Bend in the U.S. state of Oregon. Additional waterfalls are upstream along Tumalo Creek and a tributary, Bridge Creek and its Bridge Creek Falls. All of these falls are within the Deschutes National Forest.

In addition to waterfall views, the day-use area has picnic sites and a toilet and offers access to trails for hiking and mountain biking. Using the site requires a Northwest Forest Pass or payment of a fee. 

The trail continues beyond the falls. About  further upstream, it reaches a second waterfall, Middle Tumalo Falls, a two-tiered cascade totaling  in height.

See also
 Tumalo State Park
 List of waterfalls in Oregon

References

Waterfalls of Deschutes County, Oregon
Waterfalls of Oregon
Deschutes National Forest